Dom Henricus Smeulders, O.Cist. (13 May 1826 – 28 June 1892), born Joseph-Gauthier-Henri, was a Belgian Abbot of the Common observance. He was considered one of the major historical figures of Cistercian history of the second half of the 19th century.

Career 
He entered in 1843 in Bornem Abbey, 17 years old. He became Doctor of Theology in 1858 at the Gregorian University, Rome. During his life in Bornem he was between 1858 and 1865 Librarian. By request of the Abbot General he was sent back to Rome, and became famous for his knowledge of the Cistercian history. He was requested by the Italian Cistercian Congregation to succeed Procurator  Hieronymus Bottino, who died in 1871.

He was elected titular abbot of Santa Maria di Valdiponte, in 1878. His fame in Rome was remarked by pope Leo XIII, who sent him as apostolic delegate to Canada. He was accompanied by his secretary Dom Amadeus. After his return in Rome, he requested to retrait and he died there in 1892. He was buried in Campo Verano. His portrait is kept inside the Abbey of Bornem.

References

Cistercian abbots
Belgian abbots
Belgian Cistercians
People from Bornem
People from Mol, Belgium
Belgian librarians
19th-century Belgian Roman Catholic theologians
Pontifical Gregorian University alumni
1826 births
1892 deaths